Agam Rudberg (born 8 February 1986) is an Israeli actress and model.

Early life
Rudberg was born in moshav Ramat Tzvi, Israel, to an Israeli-born father of Ashkenazi Jewish (Romanian-Jewish and Latvian-Jewish) descent, and to a Moroccan-born mother of both Sephardi Jewish and Mizrahi Jewish descent. When she was 10, her father died.

In 2005, Rudberg enlisted as a soldier in the Israel Defense Forces. She served in the IDF theatre of the Education and Youth Corps.

Career
Rudberg was discovered by a model agent at age 13. She became a model for the shoe brand Skechers and has featured in international magazines, including Maxim, and modeled for brands, including Remington Products.

In 2003, Rudberg appeared in Israel Channel 2's telenovela Love Around the Corner.

In 2004, she took part in Festigal, an annual Israeli song and dance show for children, and has taken part many times since.

In 2006, she appeared in Israeli telenovela HaShir Shelanu. She has subsequently appeared in many Israeli television shows, becoming one of Israel's more popular actresses during the early and mid-2000s and being voted as "Israel's sexiest woman".

In 2014, Rudberg took a role in Temporarily Dead, a new medical drama.

Personal life
Rudberg has led a campaign to raise funds for the treatment of skin cancer in Israel.

She criticized Bar Refaeli for evading the military draft in Israel, saying: "The way Bar Refaeli evaded army service wasn't right. It's worth trying to serve in the army, and only if you don't feel good there to try and do something."

Filmography

Television

References

External links 
  - Agam Rudberg on Instagram
 
Agam Rudberg at Ishim (Israeli film data base)

1986 births
21st-century Israeli actresses
Israeli child models
Israeli female models
Israeli film actresses
Israeli television actresses
Jewish Israeli actresses
Jewish female models
Living people
People from Northern District (Israel)
Telenovela actresses
Israeli female military personnel
Israeli people of Romanian-Jewish descent
Israeli people of Latvian-Jewish descent
Israeli people of Moroccan-Jewish descent
Israeli Jews
Israeli Ashkenazi Jews
Israeli Sephardi Jews
Israeli Mizrahi Jews